Needcompany is an international performance group formed in 1986.

The two artists at the heart of Needcompany are Jan Lauwers and Grace Ellen Barkey. Lauwers is the company's founder and artistic director.

Their associated performing artists are MaisonDahlBonnema (Hans Petter Dahl & Anna Sophia Bonnema), Lemm&Barkey (Lot Lemm & Grace Ellen Barkey), OHNO COOPERATION (Maarten Seghers & Jan Lauwers) and the NC ensemble, which includes Viviane De Muynck. They create work of their own under Needcompany's wings.

Needcompany's work has been documented by John Freeman in 'The Greatest Shows on Earth: World Theatre from Peter Brook to the Sydney Olympics' and 
in an article for New Theatre Quarterly 'No Boundaries Here: Brecht, Lauwers, and European Theatre after Postmodernism' 29(03).

Work by Jan Lauwers
 1987 : Need to Know
 1989 : ça va
 1990 : Julius Caesar
 1991 : Invictos
 1992 : Antonius und Kleopatra
 1992 : SCHADE/schade
 1993 : Orfeo, opera by Walter Hus
 1994 : The Snakesong Trilogy - Snakesong/Le Voyeur
 1995 : The Snakesong Trilogy - Snakesong/Le Pouvoir (Leda)
 1996 : Needcompany's Macbeth
 1996 : The Snakesong Trilogy - Snakesong/Le Désir
 1997 : Caligula, No beauty for me there, where human life is rare, part one
 1998 : The Snakesong Trilogy, adapted version with live music
 1999 : Morning Song, No beauty for me there, where human life is rare, part two
 2000 : Needcompany's King Lear
 2000 : DeaDDogsDon'tDance/ DjamesDjoyceDeaD
 2001 : Ein Sturm
 2002 : Images of Affection
 2003 : No Comment
 2004 : Isabella's Room
 2006 : All is vanity
 2006 : The Lobster Shop
 2007 : The Porcelain Project
 2008 : The Deer House
 2008 : The Sad Face | Happy Face trilogy
 2011 : The art of entertainment
 2012 : ″Market Place 76″

Film work

Short films
 From Alexandria (1988)
 Mangia (1995)
 Sampled Images (2000)
 C-Song 01 (2003)
 C-Songs – The Lobster Shop (2006)

Film
 Goldfish Game (2002)
 I Want (No) Reality (2012) by Ana Brzezinska

Other 
 The Unauthorized Portrait by Nico Leunen

Work by Grace Ellen Barkey
 1992 : One
 1993 : Don Quijote
 1995 : Tres
 1997 : Stories (histoires/verhalen)
 1998 : Rood Red Rouge
 1999 : The Miraculous Mandarin
 2000 : Few Things
 2002 : (AND)
 2005 : Chunking
 2007 : The Porcelain Project
 2010: This door is too small (for a bear)'
 2013 : Mush-Room'' with music by The Residents

External links
 
 
 

Theatre companies
Performance artist collectives